is a river in Aomori Prefecture, Japan. It begins in the northern Hakkōda Mountains and flows into Aomori Bay at Aomori.

References

External links 
 Rivers Division of Aomori Prefectural Government (in Japanese)

Rivers of Aomori Prefecture